Grevillea sericea, commonly known as the pink spider flower, is a species of flowering plant in the family Proteaceae and is endemic to New South Wales. It is a shrub with elliptic to lance-shaped leaves with the narrower end towards the base, and clusters of usually pink flowers arranged on one side of a flowering rachis.

Description

Taxonomy
This species was first formally described in 1794 by James Edward Smith who gave it the name Embothrium sericeum in his book, A Specimen of the Botany of New Holland. In 1810, Robert Brown transferred it into Grevillea as G. sericea in Transactions of the Linnean Society of London.

In 1994, Peter M. Olde and Neil R. Marriott described two subspecies of G. sericea in The Grevillea Book, and the names are accepted by the Australian Plant Census:
 Grevillea sericea subsp. riparia (R.Br.)
 Grevillea sericea (Sm.)

Distribution and habitat
Pink spider flower is widespread in New South Wales, and grows in woodland and open forest from near Toronto and Wyee south to near Heathcote, and inland to near Mudgee. Subspecies riparia has a more restricted distribution, growing near permanent streams mainly near the escarpment of the Blue Mountains, along the Grose and Colo Rivers and Glenbrook Creek.

References

External links

sericea
Flora of New South Wales
Proteales of Australia
Taxa named by Robert Brown (botanist, born 1773)
Plants described in 1810